Robert Thomas Joyce (born July 11, 1966) is a former Canadian ice hockey player who played six seasons in the National Hockey League (NHL) for the Boston Bruins, Washington Capitals and Winnipeg Jets between 1988 and 1993. He was drafted by the Bruins in the fourth round (82nd overall) in the 1984 NHL Entry Draft from the University of North Dakota.

Playing career
Joyce played his college hockey at the University of North Dakota, winning the NCAA Division I national title in 1987. That year he set a school record with 52 goals.

Career notes
 As a member of the Boston Bruins, Joyce played in the famous black-out game at Boston Garden during the 1987-88 Stanley Cup finals against the Edmonton Oilers, May 24, 1988.
 Joyce made the Canadian Olympic Team for Calgary, 1988, playing only two hours away from his home.

Personal life
Joyce is currently the Director of Aviation Safety at Embry-Riddle Aeronautical University in Daytona Beach, Florida. He is also the head coach of the Embry Riddle Eagles Division II ice hockey team.

Career statistics

Regular season and playoffs

International

Awards and honours

References

External links
 
 Profile at hockeydraftcentral.com

1966 births
Living people
Baltimore Skipjacks players
Boston Bruins draft picks
Boston Bruins players
Canadian ice hockey left wingers
Düsseldorfer EG players
EV Landshut players
Ice hockey people from New Brunswick
Ice hockey players at the 1988 Winter Olympics
Moncton Hawks players
München Barons players
NCAA men's ice hockey national champions
North Dakota Fighting Hawks men's ice hockey players
Olympic ice hockey players of Canada
Orlando Solar Bears (IHL) players
Sportspeople from Saint John, New Brunswick
Washington Capitals players
Winnipeg Jets (1979–1996) players
AHCA Division I men's ice hockey All-Americans